Gowd-e Gol-e Bibi Hakimeh (also Romanized as Gowd-e Gol-e Bībī Ḩakīmeh; also known as Gowd-e Gol, Gowd-e Kol Bībī Ḩakīmeh, and Gowd Gol) is a village in Bibi Hakimeh Rural District, in the Central District of Gachsaran County, Kohgiluyeh and Boyer-Ahmad Province, Iran. At the 2006 census, its population was 39, in 9 families.

References 

Populated places in Gachsaran County